Garow (also Romanized as Garow and Garū) is a village in Arabkhaneh Rural District, Shusef District, Nehbandan County, South Khorasan Province, Iran. At the 2006 census, its population was 60, in 23 families.

References 

Populated places in Nehbandan County